Carolyn Griffiths  is a railway engineer. She founded and lead the UK's Rail Accident Investigation Branch, where she had the position of Chief Inspector, reporting directly to the Secretary of State for Transport. She was president of the Institution of Mechanical Engineers for 2017/18.

Griffiths joined the rail industry in 1979. She was elected a Fellow of the Royal Academy of Engineering (FREng) in 2013.

For her services to the rail industry she was awarded an honorary doctorate by Cranfield University in the same year.

References

Living people
Rail accident investigators
Fellows of the Institution of Mechanical Engineers
British women engineers
British railway mechanical engineers
Fellows of the Royal Academy of Engineering
Female Fellows of the Royal Academy of Engineering
21st-century women engineers
Year of birth missing (living people)